Mitha Khan Zardari ( ، ) (b. 1918, d. 2011) was a Pakistani musician and Gharra player from Sindh Pakistan.

Early life 
Mitha Khan was born at Taluka Sinjhoro, Sanghar District of Sindh. He attended Madera high school in Naushahro Feroze city of Sindh and matriculated from Government Noor Muhammad High School Hyderabad, Sindh. He was appointed as clerk in police department in 1942 and retired from services as an office superintendent in1980.

Career
Mitha Khan Zardari performed with Khamiso Khan and Ghous Bux Brohi.

Awards
He received the Shah Abdul Latif Bhitai award, Sachal Sarmast award, Lal Shahbaz Qalander award and Presidential award from President of Pakistan Ghulam Ishaque Khan in 1988.

Death
He died of heart failure on 12 May 2011 in age of 93 years and left behind six sons and two daughters.

References 

Pakistani artists
Pakistani folk music
1918 births
2011 deaths
People from Sanghar District